The League of Provinces of the Philippines (LPP), also referred to as the League of Provinces, is an organization composed of governors of the provinces in the Philippines. All of the 82 provinces are members of the organization.

Statutory basis 
Its creation and purpose is mandated by Section 502 of the Republic Act No. 7160, otherwise known as the Local Government Code of 1991, as amended, which states:

There shall be an organization of all provinces to be known as the League of Provinces for the primary purpose of ventilating, articulating and crystallizing issues affecting provincial and metropolitan political subdivision government administration, and securing, through proper and legal means, solutions thereto. For this purpose, the Metropolitan Manila Area and any metropolitan political subdivision shall be considered as separate provincial units of the league.

Objectives
The league as the following objectives:

To foster unity and cooperation among all provinces of the country;
To provide a cohesive force that embodies the sentiments and aspirations of member provinces;
To serve as a forum of discussion and feedback mechanism on policies affecting local governments;
To collaborate with national and other local government agencies in attaining efficient and effective inter-governmental relations to provide development programs that will enrich and upgrade the capabilities of local government units;
To engage in continuing programs for the development of local government units;
To involve League officers and members in international associations, conventions, seminars and congresses.

Representation
Each province is represented in the League by their governor.  In case of his absence or incapacity, the vice governor or a sanggunian member of the province shall be its representative after being elected for this purpose by its members.

Powers, functions and duties 
Section 504 of the Local Government Code of 1991 outlines the following powers, functions and duties of the League:

Assist the national government in the formulation and implementation of the policies, programs and projects affecting provinces as a whole
Promote local autonomy at the provincial level
Adopt measures for the promotion of the welfare of all provinces and its officials and employees
Encourage people's participation in local government administration in order to promote united and concerted action for the attainment of countrywide development goals;
Supplement the efforts of the national government in creating opportunities for gainful employment within the province
Give priority to programs designed for the total development of the provinces in consonance with the policies, programs and projects of the national government
Serve as a forum for crystallizing and expressing ideas, seeking the necessary assistance of the national government and providing the private sector avenues for cooperation in the promotion of the welfare of the provinces
Exercise such other powers and perform such other duties and functions as the league may prescribe for the welfare of the provinces and metropolitan political subdivisions.

Funding
The league is funded by contributions of its member local government units and/or by any fund raising activity that they organize. These funds shall be deposited to the treasurer as trust funds and is subjected to pertinent accounting and auditing rules.

References

Philippine local government unit leagues